Ayyubiyeh Agriculture Department ( – Garaveh Keshāvarzī-ye Āyyūbīyeh) is a village and department in Dehshir Rural District, in the Central District of Taft County, Yazd Province, Iran. At the 2006 census, its population was 28, in eight families.

References 

Populated places in Taft County